Adams County is a county located in the U.S. state of Mississippi. As of the 2020 census, the population was 29,538. The county seat is Natchez.

The county is the first to have been organized in the former Mississippi Territory. It is named for the second President of the United States, John Adams, who held that office when the county was organized in 1799. Adams County is part of the Natchez micropolitan area which consists of Adams County, Mississippi and Concordia Parish, Louisiana.

History
Adams County was created on April 2, 1799, from part of Pickering Territorial County. The county was organized eighteen years before Mississippi became a state. Four Mississippi governors have come from Adams County: David Holmes, George Poindexter, John A. Quitman, and Gerard Brandon.

In 1860, before the US Civil War, Adams County was the richest county in the United States.

Geography

Major highways
  U.S. Highway 61
  U.S. Highway 84
  U.S. Highway 98
  U.S. Highway 425
  Natchez Trace Parkway

Adjacent counties
 Jefferson County (north)
 Franklin County (east)
 Wilkinson County (south)
 Concordia Parish, Louisiana (southwest)
 Tensas Parish, Louisiana (northwest)

National protected areas
 Homochitto National Forest (part)
 Natchez National Historical Park
 Natchez Trace Parkway (part)
 St. Catherine Creek National Wildlife Refuge

Demographics

Population 
As of the 2020 United States Census, there were 29,538 people, 11,237 households, and 6,650 families residing in the county.

Race

In 2020, its racial makeup was 56.57% Black/African American, 36.99% non-Hispanic white, 0.19% Native American, 0.56% Asian, 0.02% Pacific Islander, 2.24% other or mixed, and 3.43% Hispanic or Latino of any race. In 2010, 53.5% were Black or African American, 42.7% White, 0.4% Asian, 0.3% Native American, 1.7% of some other race and 1.4% of two or more races. 6.7% were Hispanic or Latino (of any race).

Education
Alcorn State University, a historically black college that was designated as a land-grant institution, has its School of Business and School of Nursing at Natchez. The School of Business offers Masters of Business Administration degree and some undergraduate classes at the School of Business, Natchez campus. Adjacent to the Natchez campus of Alcorn State University is Copiah-Lincoln Community College.

Economy
Adams County Correctional Center, a private prison operated by the Corrections Corporation of America on behalf of the Federal Bureau of Prisons, is in an unincorporated area in the county.

Top employers
The top employers of Adams County are as follows:
1. Natchez-Adams School District (620)
2. Merit Health Natchez (425)
3. Adams County Correctional Center (380)
4. Walmart (365)
5. City of Natchez (275)
6. Magnolia Bluffs Casino (250)
7. Jordan Carriers (250)
8. Supermarket Operations (250)
9. Adams County Government (220)
10. Energy Drilling (220)

Communities

City
 Natchez (county seat and only municipality)

Census-designated places
 Cloverdale
 Morgantown

Unincorporated communities
 Cranfield
 Kingston
 Pine Ridge
 Sibley
 Stanton
 Washington

Ghost/extinct towns
 Arnot
 Briers
 Ellis Cliffs
 Hutchins Landing
 Kienstra
 Selsertown

Politics

Adams County, typical of other counties in the Solid South, was heavily Democratic during the first half of the 20th century. After supporting Dixiecrat Strom Thurmond in 1948, it began to lean more Republican, and remained that way until the 1980s. Since 1992, Adams County has returned to the Democratic fold.

See also
 Jefferson College
 National Register of Historic Places listings in Adams County, Mississippi

References

Sources
 Brieger, James. Hometown, Mississippi.

External links
 Adams County Courthouse Pictures
 Adams County Interactive Oil Well Map Mississippi Oil Journal
 Adams County Police and Miscellaneous County Records, Special Collections at The University of Southern Mississippi.

 
Populated places established in 1799
Mississippi counties
Natchez micropolitan area
Mississippi counties on the Mississippi River
1799 establishments in Mississippi Territory
Black Belt (U.S. region)
Majority-minority counties in Mississippi